The Marschalk reaction in chemistry is the sodium dithionite promoted reaction of a phenolic anthraquinone with an aldehyde to yield a substituted phenolic anthraquinone after the addition of acid.

The mechanism can be found in the book Named Reactions in Organic Chemistry, and its more intuitive version is provided below:

One of the first applications of this reaction was reported in 1985.

References

Organic reactions
Name reactions